Ivan Corrado Pauletta (December 22, 1936 – March 18, 2017) was an Istrian Italian politician, journalist and writer active in Croatia.

Early life and education
Pauletta was born in Premantura, a village in the municipality of Medulin, in the southern part of Istrian peninsula, then part of the Kingdom of Italy. He lived in Ventimiglia until 1946, near Italian border with France, where his father had job at Italian customs. He graduated in mechanical engineering in 1964 in Zagreb, capital of the Socialist Republic of Croatia, then part of the SFR Yugoslavia, earning a bachelor's degree.

Career
Pauletta's career ranged from being a craftsman, a director of a factory in Pula that supplied souvenir producers in Medjugorje, to a politician and a member of the Croatian Parliament.

Politician
He officially entered politics in 1982, when Pauletta was elected representative of craftsmen in the Associated Labor Council of the Croatian Parliament in SR Croatia. He continued to deal with politics in a local newspaper in Rijeka, with which he began to collaborate in 1988. In 1990 he was among the founders of the Istrian Democratic Assembly, a political party founded on the eve of first multi-party elections in the independent Croatia. In the same year he went to Italy to work and in 1993 Pauletta returned to Croatia where he became a deputy of the Croatian Parliament or Sabor. He was also an activist in Nonviolent Radical Party Transnational and Transparty and Pauletta spoke several times from Radio Radicale; in 1997 he retired from politics to pursue writing.

He is also known for the project "Terra d'Istria", or "Histria Terra", which claims an even greater autonomy of Istria from the central government of Zagreb. However, the project was never carried out, and it was indeed a reason for harsh criticism of Pauletta, accused of being an irredentist close to Italian far-right circles.

Writer
He made scientific publications regarding mechanical engineering, and he worked as an occasional teacher at the Faculty of Mechanical Engineering in Zenica, Bosnia and Herzegovina.

At the end of 1999 he published his first book Histria Collage or Histrija Kolaz in both languages Italian and Croat. In 2005 he published his second book The fugitive: in this book Pauletta tells the stories of various persons who escape from Istria in communist Yugoslavia to enter Italy during the period 1945-1959. With a group of authors in 2007, he published a monograph about Premantura. His fourth book, Stories of Istria, was released in 2009. In 2014, Pauletta wrote his final book Mladić iz stoljeća prošlog which translates as The young man of the last century.

See also
 Istrianism
 Luciano Delbianco
 Furio Radin

References 

1936 births
2017 deaths
Istrian Italian people
Representatives in the modern Croatian Parliament
Istrian Democratic Assembly politicians
People from Istria County
People from Ventimiglia
Italian writers
Croatian writers